Eaton-under-Heywood is a civil parish in Shropshire, England.  It contains 17 listed buildings that are recorded in the National Heritage List for England.  Of these, one is listed at Grade I, the highest of the three grades, three are at Grade II*, the middle grade, and the others are at Grade II, the lowest grade.  The parish contains the villages of Eaton and Ticklerton, and smaller settlements including Birtley and Soudley, and is otherwise rural.  Most of the listed buildings are houses and associated structures, farmhouses and farm buildings.  The other listed buildings are a church, a sundial and a monument in the churchyard, and a war memorial.


Key

Buildings

References

Citations

Sources

Lists of buildings and structures in Shropshire